Tom McAdam (6 March 1917 — 1955) was an English professional footballer who played as a winger.

Career
McAdam began his career in the youth ranks at Arsenal. In senior football, McAdam played for Tufnell Park, before joining Southend United in 1937, where he made two Football League appearances, scoring once. In 1938, McAdam signed for Gillingham. In March 1938, McAdam signed for Southern League side Chelmsford City.

References

1917 births
1955 deaths
Association football wingers
English footballers
People from Shadwell
Tufnell Park F.C. players
Southend United F.C. players
Gillingham F.C. players
Chelmsford City F.C. players
English Football League players
Southern Football League players